Shishir Shinde (born 24 February 1954) is a Shiv Sena politician from the Maharashtra, India. He was member of the Maharashtra Legislative Assembly representing Bhandup West constituency.

In October 1991, in order to stop a scheduled India-Pakistan test cricket match, Shinde, along with a few party workers of Shiv Sena, vandalized the pitch of Wankhede Stadium. By digging and pouring engine oil, the pitch was rendered useless for play and led to the cancellation of the series.

Positions held
 1992: Elected as corporator in the Brihanmumbai Municipal Corporation 
 1996: Elected as member of the Maharashtra Legislative Council
 2009: Elected to Maharashtra Legislative Assembly

References

External links
  Shivsena Home Page 

Maharashtra Navnirman Sena politicians
Maharashtra MLAs 2009–2014
Marathi politicians
Politicians from Mumbai
Living people
1954 births
Members of the Maharashtra Legislative Council
Shiv Sena politicians